Willie Miles Harper (born July 30, 1950) is a former American football linebacker who played for the San Francisco 49ers.

Harper played high school football for Toledo Scott and college football at University of Nebraska where he was an All-American in 1972 and was drafted in the second round of the 1973 NFL Draft by the 49ers, who he stayed with for eleven years, from 1973 to 1983. He moved to the USFL in 1984 to play for the New Jersey Generals. He finished his career with the Houston Gamblers in 1985.

His son, Josh Harper, played college football at Fresno State University. His granddaughter is rapper Saweetie.

References

1950 births
Living people
All-American college football players
American football linebackers
Houston Gamblers players
Nebraska Cornhuskers football players
New Jersey Generals players
San Francisco 49ers players